Senator Chandler may refer to:

Members of the United States Senate
Happy Chandler (1898–1991), U.S. Senator from Kentucky
William E. Chandler (1835–1917), U.S. Senator from New Hampshire
Zachariah Chandler (1813–1879), U.S. Senator from Michigan

United States state senate members
 Harriette L. Chandler (born 1937), Massachusetts State Senate
 John Chandler (1762–1841), Maine State Senate
 John E. Chandler (1915-1982), Kansas State Senate
 Leonard B. Chandler (1851–1927), Massachusetts State Senate
 Oliver P. Chandler (1807–1895), Vermont State Senate
 Thomas Chandler (New Hampshire politician) (1772–1866), New Hampshire State Senate
 Walter Chandler (1887–1967), Tennessee State Senate
 Willard H. Chandler (1830–1901), Wisconsin State Senate
 William Henry Chandler (politician) (1815–1888)

See also
Senator Candler (disambiguation)